The 1968 Buffalo Bills season was the team’s ninth season.

The Bills' 1–12–1 record in 1968 (a 0.107 winning percentage) is the second-worst in team history: the 1971 Bills went 1–13. They were one of only two teams in AFL history (the other being the 1962 Oakland Raiders) to finish the season with only one victory.

The Bills, coming off a 4–10 season in 1967, fired coach Joe Collier after an 0–2 start in 1968. Defensive backfield coach Harvey Johnson was promoted to interim head coach, where he went 1–10–1 to finish the year.

With the release of running back Wray Carlton, wide receiver Elbert Dubenion was the last player from the Bills' original roster in 1960 to still be with the team.

The majority of Buffalo's games were started by backup quarterback Dan Darragh, after injuries claimed the seasons of long-time starter Jack Kemp and new addition Tom Flores. Even Darragh and new addition Kay Stephenson were injured. Ultimately, running back Ed Rutkowski, who hadn't played the quarterback position since college six years prior, ended up starting at quarterback for the Bills.

Buffalo's only win of the season was a home victory over the New York Jets, in which the Bills held a 16-point lead in the fourth quarter before giving up two late touchdowns to the Jets. Ultimately, the Bills were able to hold on to the two-point win.

Offseason
 August 24: Bills sign fullback Wayne Patrick.
 August 27: Bills acquire quarterback (and future Bills head coach) Kay Stephenson from the San Diego Chargers for a Fifth Round Pick.
 August 28: Bills acquire fullback Bob Cappadona from the Boston Patriots for a ninth round draft pick.
 September 2: The Bills cut running backs Wray Carlton, wide receiver Ed Rutkowski (who would return later in the season as a quarterback), tight end Charley Ferguson and defensive tackle Dudley Meredith.

AFL Draft

Personnel

Coaches/Staff

Source: https://pro-football-history.com/franchise/7/buffalo-bills-coaches

Final roster

Preseason

Regular season

Schedule

Standings

Game summaries

Week 12 vs. Raiders

Thanksgiving Day

Awards and Records 
 Bob Kalsu, Team Rookie of the Year

References 

Buffalo Bills on Pro Football Reference
Buffalo Bills on jt-sw.com

Buffalo Bills
Buffalo Bills seasons
Buffalo